Erika De La Cruz is a Mexican-American TV host, bestselling author and media personality best known for The LA Girl and Passionistas: Tips Tales & Tweetables from Women Pursuing their Dreams.

Career
De La Cruz started her career as brand ambassador of Fashion Week San Diego and covering radio events for KIFM, easy 98.1. She founded Passion to Paycheck, which addresses mental health awareness, and is the author of the bestseller Passionistas: Tips Tales & Tweetables from Women Pursuing their Dreams. De La Cruz works with Connected Women of Influence, Susan G. Komen and is a keynote SUE Talks speaker. She was cast on Dream Life with Caitlyn Jenner.

The LA Girl

The LA Girl was founded in 2014. After five years, the original founder was pursuing other goals and asked De La Cruz if she wanted the job. In 2021, De La Cruz became editor in chief.

Personal life
De La Cruz is a Mexican-American who was raised in Northern California. With a background in red carpet hosting, she graduated with a film and fashion degree from San Diego State University. In 2019, De La Cruz married tech CEO Jock Purtle.

References

American television hosts
American women television presenters
Living people
Year of birth missing (living people)
American women television personalities
American women in film
American women bloggers
American television personalities of Mexican descent
Radio personalities from San Diego
Radio personalities from Los Angeles
American radio hosts
San Diego State University alumni
Mexican women bloggers
Fashion influencers